The imitator goshawk or imitator sparrowhawk (Accipiter imitator) is a species of bird of prey in the family Accipitridae. It is found on the islands of Bougainville, Choiseul and Santa Isabel in the Solomon Islands archipelago. Its natural habitats are subtropical or tropical moist lowland forest and subtropical or tropical moist montane forest.

It is threatened by habitat loss.

References

BirdLife Species Factsheet.

imitator goshawk
Birds of Bougainville Island
Birds of the Solomon Islands
imitator goshawk
Taxonomy articles created by Polbot